Koodi Balona (Kannada: ಕೂಡಿ ಬಾಳೋಣ) is a 1975 Indian Kannada film, directed by M. R. Vittal and produced by Shivalingaiah. The film stars Vishnuvardhan, Bhavani, Loknath and T. N. Balakrishna in the lead roles. The film has musical score by G. K. Venkatesh.

Cast
Vishnuvardhan
Bhavani
Loknath
T. N. Balakrishna
Dwarakish
Leelavathi

References

External links
 

1970s Kannada-language films
Films scored by G. K. Venkatesh